Sertã is a civil parish in the municipality of Sertã, Portugal. The population in 2011 was 6,196, in an area of 80.95 km². The parish includes the following villages:

Aldeia da Ribeira Cimeira 
Aldeia da Ribeira Fundeira 
Amial 
Amioso 
Calvos 
Capitólio 
Chão da Forca 
Codiceira 
Herdade 
Maxial or Maxial da Estrada 
Maxial da Carreira 
Maxialinho 
Moinho da Rola 
Outeiro da Lagoa 
Pombas 
São João do Couto 
Senhora dos Remédios 
Serra do Pinheiro 
Sertã 
Vale de Água 
Vale da Cortiçada or Corkiçada Valley
Vale Porco 
Venda da Pedra 
Venestal 
Verdelhos 
Vilar da Carga

References

Freguesias of Sertã